Princess Alexandra Amalie of Bavaria (26 August 1826 – 21 September 1875) was a German princess and writer.

Life
Alexandra was born in Schloss Johannisburg in Aschaffenburg, the eighth child and fifth daughter of King Ludwig I of Bavaria and of his wife, Princess Therese of Saxe-Hildburghausen.  As a girl, her portrait was painted by Joseph Karl Stieler for the Gallery of Beauties which her father commissioned at Schloss Nymphenburg.

Alexandra never married, and instead was appointed abbess of the Royal Chapter for Ladies of Saint Anne in Munich and Würzburg; this was a religious community specifically for noble ladies.  In the 1850s, Prince Louis Lucien Bonaparte asked King Ludwig for Alexandra's hand in marriage, but he was divorced from his wife, and Ludwig refused, using as an excuse Alexandra's delicate health.

Writer
In 1852, Alexandra began a literary career.  Her first book of stories was entitled Weihnachtsrosen (Christmas roses).  The next year she published Souvenirs, pensées et essais (Memories, thoughts and essays). In 1856 appeared Feldblumen (Field flowers), the proceeds of which she donated to the Maximilian Orphanage.  In 1858 appeared Phantasie- und Lebensbilder (Daydreams and biographical sketches), a collection of loose translations into German from English and French.  In 1862, she produced a loose translation into German of some of the romances of Eugenie Foa. The following year appeared Thautropfen (Dewdrops), a collection of stories translated into German from French as well as others of her own.

In 1870, Alexandra produced Das Kindertheater (The children's theatre), a German translation of some French children's plays from Arnaud Berquin's L'ami des enfants.  That same year appeared Der erste des Monats (The first of the month), a German translation of Jean-Nicolas Bouilly's French book.  In 1873, she produced Maiglöckchen (Lilies of the valley), a collection of stories.  Alexandra also had a number of contributions published in Isabella Braun's periodical Jugendblätter.

Alexandra died on 21 September 1875 (the same day as her brother Prince Adalbert) at the age of 49 at Schloss Nymphenburg.  She is buried in the Wittelsbach crypt in the Theatinerkirche in Munich.

Psychological issues
Notwithstanding her literary accomplishments, Alexandra suffered from a number of psychological eccentricities, including a fixation with cleanliness as well as wearing only white clothes. In her early twenties, she notably developed a delusion that as a child she had swallowed a grand piano made of glass, which remained inside her. This delusion was the subject of a 2010 BBC Radio 3 programme called "The Glass Piano", written and narrated by poet Deborah Levy, with musical sound effects interspersed between commentary by psychoanalyst Susie Orbach and others. She is the subject of a play at the Coronet Cinema in 2019.

See also
King Ludwig II of Bavaria, Alexandra's nephew, also known for notable eccentricity
 Glass delusion

Ancestry

Notes

Sources
Rall, Hans. Wittelsbacher Lebensbilder von Kaiser Ludwig bis zur Gegenwart: Führer durch die Münchener Fürstengrüfte mit Verzeichnis aller Wittelsbacher Grablegen und Grabstätten. München: Wittelsbacher Ausgleichsfonds.

External links

1826 births
1875 deaths
House of Wittelsbach
Bavarian princesses
People from Aschaffenburg
Burials at the Theatine Church, Munich
19th-century German writers
Daughters of kings